Thiemo de Bakker and Antal van der Duim were the defending champions but decided not to participate together.
de Bakker played alongside Thomas Schoorel, while van der Duim partnered up with Boy Westerhof.
Rameez Junaid and Simon Stadler won the final 4–6, 6–1, [10–5] against Simon Greul and Bastian Knittel.

Seeds

Draw

Draw

References
 Main Draw

TEAN International - Doubles
2012 Doubles